John Harley McNeal (August 11, 1878 – January 11, 1945) was a Major League Baseball pitcher who appeared in 12 games for the Cleveland Bluebirds in their 1901 season.

External links

1878 births
1945 suicides
Cleveland Blues (1901) players
Major League Baseball pitchers
Baseball players from Ohio
Ohio Northern Polar Bears baseball players
Ohio Wesleyan Battling Bishops baseball players
Toledo Mud Hens players
Schenectady Electricians players
Scranton Miners players
Baltimore Orioles (IL) players
Wilkes-Barre Barons (baseball) players
Birmingham Barons players
Suicides by firearm in Ohio